Willis J. Johnson (born 1947) is an American billionaire businessman. He is the founder and former chief executive of Copart, a vehicle salvage and auction company, founded in 1982.

Biography

Born in 1947, Johnson grew up on a dairy farm in the vicinity of Siloam Springs, Arkansas. He received his early education from a high school in California. Johnson then joined the Army and served a year-long tour in Vietnam which earned him a Purple Heart. In 1972, he bought his own junkyard in Sacramento, California, and moved his family into a trailer to fund his purchase. He took Copart public in 1994. He launched an online bidding platform for wrecked cars in 1998 (or 2002).

Willis Johnson retired from his position of CEO of Copart in 2010 and moved to Nashville, Tennessee.

In 2015, he co-founded now defunct on-demand household chore app, Takl.

Political contributions 
Johnson is politically conservative and supports the Republican Party. Since 2001, he has contributed at least $1.5 million to different conservative causes.

In 2019, he contributed $50,000 to the 'Trump Victory', a political action committee.

In 2021, he donated $1 million to South Dakota Governor Kristi Noem to fund a National Guard deployment to the Texas/Mexico border.

Assets
In 2010, he bought an 18,600 square foot mansion in Nashville for $28 million from American country singer Alan Jackson.

Johnson also owns a 79-acre vineyard in Suisun Valley, California.

Publications

Personal life
Johnson is married to Joyce, whom he married after returning from the Vietnam War. Johnson is a practising Christian.

Johnson resides in Franklin, Tenn., and owns a large collection of classic cars, including a 1955 Chevrolet.

His son-in-law, Jay Adair, is the chief executive officer (CEO) of Copart, and owns shares in the company worth more than $800 million.

References

Living people
1947 births
American billionaires
American business executives
Oklahoma Republicans
United States Army personnel of the Vietnam War